Granulina boucheti is a species of minute sea snail, a marine gastropod mollusc in the family Granulinidae.

Description
The length of the shell attains 2.1 mm.

Distribution
This marine species is endemic to Sicily. The type locality is Aci Trezza.

References

 Gofas S. (1992). "Le genre Granulina (Marginellidae) en Méditerranée et dans l'Atlantique oriental". Bollettino Malacologico 28(1-4): 1-26. (original description: 10-11)

Gastropods described in 1992
Granulinidae